Midway is a city in northwestern Wasatch County, Utah, United States. The population was 3,845 at the 2010 census.

History
A post office called Midway has been in operation since 1864. The town was so named for its central location in an agricultural district.

Geography
According to the United States Census Bureau, the city has a total area of 3.3 square miles (8.7 km2), all land. The region in which Midway sits is known as the Wasatch Back. Midway is bisected from north to south by Snake Creek, which includes the Midway Fish Hatchery just before the creek joins the middle section of the Provo River above Deer Creek Reservoir.

Climate
This climatic region is typified by large seasonal temperature differences, with warm to hot summers and cold (sometimes severely cold) winters.  According to the Köppen Climate Classification system, Midway has a humid continental climate, abbreviated "Dfb" on climate maps.

Demographics
As of the 2010 census Midway had a population of 3,845. The ethnic and racial makeup of the population was 92.6% non-Hispanic White, 0.2% African-American, 0.5% Asian, 0.1% Pacific Islander, 0.9% reporting two or more races and 5.5% Hispanic.

As of the census of 2000, there were 2,121 people, 687 households, and 550 families residing in the city. The population density was 633.3 people per square mile (/km2). There were 1,000 housing units at an average density of 298.6 per square mile (/km2). The racial makeup of the city was 97.22% White, 0.05% African American, 0.38% Native American, 0.19% Asian, 0.19% Pacific Islander, 0.38% from other races, and 1.60% from two or more races. Hispanic or Latino of any race were 2.78% of the population.

There were 687 households, out of which 43.2% had children under the age of 18 living with them, 71.0% were married couples living together, 6.4% had a female householder with no husband present, and 19.9% were non-families. 18.0% of all households were made up of individuals, and 5.8% had someone living alone who was 65 years of age or older. The average household size was 3.09 and the average family size was 3.53.

In the city, the population was spread out, with 33.5% under the age of 18, 9.9% from 18 to 24, 25.8% from 25 to 44, 21.7% from 45 to 64, and 9.0% who were 65 years of age or older. The median age was 31 years. For every 100 females, there were 104.9 males. For every 100 females age 18 and over, there were 98.6 males.

The median income for a household in the city was $51,071, and the median income for a family was $55,809. Males had a median income of $40,870 versus $25,682 for females. The per capita income for the city was $22,551. About 3.4% of families and 5.2% of the population were below the poverty line, including 6.4% of those under age 18 and 4.9% of those age 65 or over.

City Council
Midway is governed by a five person city council. The members of the city council as of September 2019 are Lisa Orme, Steve Dougherty, Jeff Drury, Kevin Payne, and JC Simonsen.

Swiss Days
Midway Swiss Days brings thousands of people to the town. The event was started in 1947 through the efforts of Luke's Hot Pots Resort owners, Joseph B. and Pauline S. Erwin. It was originally called Harvest Days. They formed a club known as the "Midway Boosters," which is still active, and whose members promote city improvements and activities.  In order to attract larger crowds to Midway, the idea of a Swiss theme was created by Orma W. Wallengren (a.k.a. Clair Peterson) whose family owned and operated the Homestead Resort, replacing the name and theme of Harvest Days with Swiss Days.

Notable facts

In the film 127 Hours, the scene where Ralston and 2 girls drop into a hidden pool was filmed at Homestead caldera at the Homestead Resort.

Midway was the city nearest the site of the 2002 Winter Olympics cross-country and biathlon events, which took place at Soldier Hollow.
The community is also known for the large "hot-pot" or geo-thermal Homestead caldera at the Homestead Resort. There is year-round scuba diving in the caldera's 90-95 degree water.

The Homestead is also the site of an 18-hole golf course designed by Bruce Summerhays, Senior PGA Tour Pro.

Midway stood in for the fictional town of Everwood, Colorado, in the closing scenes of the episode, "Foreverwood", the series finale of the TV show, Everwood. Background shots overlooking the town were filmed from Memorial Hill, with the Wasatch Range in the background.

Midway was highlighted in the 2019 Hallmark Movie The Mistletoe Secret.

The 1974 NBC T.V. series titled "Movin 'On", filmed an episode named 'Hoots' in Midway. It was about a farm family who were Hutterites. The local farmers who were not of this descent wanted the family out of the area.  Claude Akins was the star of the Movin' On series. This episode has been remastered and is available on DVD and on YouTube.

See also

 List of cities in Utah

References

External links

 
 Swiss Days

Cities in Utah
Cities in Wasatch County, Utah
Populated places established in 1859
Swiss-American culture in Utah
1859 establishments in Utah Territory